Mana Pass or Chongnyi La (‌) is one of the highest vehicle-accessible passes in the world, containing a road constructed in the 2005-2010 period for the Indian military by the Border Roads Organisation and visible on 2011 imagery on visual globe systems such as Google Earth.

Geography

Mana Pass is located within the Nanda Devi Biosphere Reserve, 47 km north of the town of Mana, India and 52 km north of the Hindu pilgrimage town of Badrinath in Uttarakhand.  It is the source of the Saraswati River, the longest stem of one of the longest Ganges tributaries, the Alaknanda River.  That river trickles through several scenic small ponds between the pass and Lake Deo Tal three km southwest of the pass. Mana pass is also the key col for climbing Chaukhamba peak.

Mana as a name derives from "Manibhadra Ashram", the ancient name of the town of Mana.

History
Mana Pass was an ancient trade route between Uttarakhand and Tibet.  Mana Pass led from Badrinath to the kingdom, now province, of Guge in Tibet. The Portuguese Jesuits António de Andrade and Manuel Marques became the first known Europeans to enter Tibet across Mana Pass in 1624.  The pass continued as a minor trade route until its closure in 1951 by the Chinese.  On April 29, 1954, China and India signed an agreement granting pilgrims and indigenous travelers the right to travel between the two countries through Mana Pass.

Access
The pass is reached from the south by an extension of India National Highway 7 (NH-7, old number NH-58) that connects Fazilka with Badrinath, though beyond Badrinath the graded road is subject to landslides. Group of enthusiast motorcycle riders often can be seen on this road. Free Souls Rider Motorcycle Club was first non military citizens to scale the heights of Mana Pass and hold the record in The Limca Book Of Records.

References

Bibliography
  Holdich, Sir Thomas H; Tibet the Mysterious, (1906) University Press, Cambridge, Massachusetts
  MacGregor, John. Tibet: A Chronicle of Exploration, (1970) Routledge & Kegan Paul, London, SBN 7100-6615-5

External links
Trading Routes of the Himalayas
  Agreement Between India and China

Mountain passes of Uttarakhand
Mountain passes of Tibet
Mountain passes of China
Mountain passes of India
Mountain passes of the Himalayas
China–India border crossings
India–Tibet relations